This is an index to notable programming languages, in current or historical use. Dialects of BASIC, esoteric programming languages, and markup languages are not included.  A programming language does not need to be imperative or Turing-complete, but must be executable and so does not include markups such as HTML or XML, but does include domain-specific languages such as SQL and its dialects.

A

B

C

D

E

F

G

H

I

J

K

L

M

N

O

P

Q

R

S

T

U

V

W

X

Y

Z

See also 

 Lists of programming languages
 List of programming languages by type
 Comparison of programming languages
 List of BASIC dialects
 List of markup languages
 List of stylesheet languages
 History of programming languages
 :Category:Programming languages